The Miami Fire-Rescue Department, also referred to as the City of Miami Department of Fire-Rescue, provides fire protection and emergency medical services for the city of Miami, Florida. The department is notable for being the first in the nation to equip all apparatus with two-way radios as well as being the first to use fog nozzles.

History 

The Miami Fire-Rescue Department was formally created on July 17, 1898 when five men gathered in a Miami bar to remedy, what they saw as, the outrageous cost of fire insurance in the city. At the time, the premiums in Miami were the highest in the nation, with annual rates at eight percent of a structure's value. This was largely due to the fact that the city, constructed of all wood, had no fire service. In an effort to reduce the cost of insurance, the men agreed to form the volunteer Miami Fire-Rescue Department.

In June 1969, the department became the first in the United States to successfully revive a patient in the field through defibrillation. By using radio transmission of an EKG, as well as radio contact with doctors at Jackson Memorial Hospital and the University of Miami School of Medicine, the firefighters were able to administer a shock to the patient who was revived from a lifeless state. Three years later, the department became the first in the nation to use military anti-shock trousers (MAST), inflatable pants that force blood from the legs of a patient in hemorrhagic shock to the more vital regions of the body.

USAR Task Force 2

The Miami Fire-Rescue Department is the sponsoring agency for USAR Task Force 2, one of the two FEMA Urban Search and Rescue Task Forces in the state of Florida. Some of their notable deployments include Hurricane Opal (1995), September 11 attack at the WTC  (2001),  Hurricane Katrina (2005) and the 2010 Haiti earthquake.

Stations & Apparatus

References

External links

Ambulance services in the United States
Fire departments in Florida
Government of Miami
Medical and health organizations based in Florida
1898 establishments in Florida